Elachista glossina is a moth of the family Elachistidae that is endemic to Australia.

References

Moths described in 2011
Endemic fauna of Australia
glossina
Moths of Australia